Tamanna Bhatia (born 21 December 1989), better known as Tamannaah, is an Indian actress who works in Telugu, Tamil and Hindi cinema. Having starred in over 73 films, she has won a South Indian International Movie Award and received eight Filmfare Awards South nominations. She was conferred with Kalaimamani in 2010, and an honorary doctorate in 2022 for her contributions to Indian cinema.

Tamannaah began her acting career with the Hindi film Chand Sa Roshan Chehra (2005). She then debuted in Telugu cinema with Sri and Tamil cinema with Kedi (2006). In 2007, she starred in two college life-based drama films, Happy Days in Telugu and Kalloori in Tamil.

Tamannaah's notable films in Telugu cinema include Konchem Ishtam Konchem Kashtam (2009), 100% Love (2011), Oosaravelli (2011), Racha (2012), Tadakha (2013), Baahubali: The Beginning (2015), Bengal Tiger (2015), Oopiri (2016), F2: Fun and Frustration (2019), and Sye Raa Narasimha Reddy (2019). Her Tamil films include Ayan (2009), Paiyaa (2010), Siruthai (2011), Veeram (2014), Dharma Durai (2016), Devi (2016), and Sketch (2018). Tamannaah has worked in few Hindi films, including Himmatwala (2013), Entertainment (2014), and Babli Bouncer (2022).

She was nominated for Best Supporting Actress for her role as a warrior in Baahubali: The Beginning at the 42nd Saturn Awards. Tamannaah won SIIMA Award for Best Actress (Critics) – Telugu for her performance in Tadakha.

Early life 
Tamanna Bhatia was born on 21 December 1989 in Mumbai, Maharashtra to Santosh and Rajani Bhatia. She has an elder brother, Anand Bhatia. Her father is a diamond merchant. She is of Sindhi Hindu descent. She did her schooling in Maneckji Cooper Education Trust School, Mumbai. She later changed her screen name for numerological reasons, varying it slightly to Tamannaah. She has been working since the age of 13, when she was spotted at her school's annual day function and offered a lead role, which she took up, and then also became a part of Mumbai's Prithvi Theatre for a year. She worked in Abhijeet Sawant's album song "Lafzo Mein" from the album Aapka Abhijeet, which was released in 2005.

Career

2005–2008: Debut and breakthrough 

In 2005, at the age of 15, Tamannaah played the female lead in Chand Sa Roshan Chehra, which was a commercial failure at the box office. The same year, she made her debut in Telugu cinema with Sri and in Tamil cinema with Kedi in 2006. IndiaGlitz in its review called Tamannaah the "real scene-stealer" and stated that she "walks away with all honors", adding that her characters have shades of the characters played by Vijayashanti in Mannan (1992) and Ramya Krishnan in Padayappa (1999).

Her first release of 2007 was Shakti Chidambaram's Viyabari, in which she played the role of a journalist who wants to write an article about a successful entrepreneur played by S. J. Suryah. The film opened to negative reviews and flopped at the box office, but Tamannaah received praise for her performance. She got her breakthrough with Sekhar Kammula's Happy Days and Balaji Sakthivel's Kalloori, both of which featured Tamannaah as a college student. She won critical acclaim for her performances in both films. The commercial success of Happy Days and Kalloori established her career as an actress in both Telugu and Tamil films. Her performance in the latter earned her a nomination at the 56th Filmfare Awards South in the Best Tamil Actress category.

Her first appearance in 2008 was the Telugu film Kalidasu, director G. Ravicharan Reddy's debut. She was paired with Sushanth, the grandson of actor Akkineni Nageswara Rao, in his first role. Upon release, the film opened to moderate reviews and critics felt that she looked good and very romantic, but had less scope to perform. The film was an average grosser at the box office. She later made a cameo appearance in the Telugu film Ready, followed by another cameo appearance in the Telugu – Tamil bilingual Ninna Nedu Repu, titled Netru Indru Naalai in Tamil.

2009–2010: Critical acclaim 
Tamannaah's first release of 2009 was the Tamil film Padikkadavan, directed by Suraj and co-starring Dhanush, which was named after Rajinikanth's 1985 film of the same name. The film received mixed reviews from critics, but Tamannaah's performance in a limited role won praise. Padikkadavan however, became a commercial success. Her next release was the Telugu film Konchem Ishtam Konchem Kashtam, directed by Kishore Kumar Pardasany, co-starring Siddharth. The film received positive reviews from critics and she received critical acclaim for her performance, earning a nomination at the 57th Filmfare Awards South in the Best Telugu Actress category. The film, however, was an average grosser at the box office. Her next release, K. V. Anand's Ayan, co-starring Suriya, became the only major commercially successful Tamil film of the year. She later appeared in Gandhi Krishna's Ananda Thandavam, which was based on the novel Pirivom Santhippom serialised by Sujatha. She was paired with Siddharth Venugopal in the film, marking the latter's debut. The film opened to negative reviews, and was her only commercial failure in 2009. However, Tamannaah's performance was critically acclaimed. Pavithra Srinivasan of Rediff.com stated that Tamannaah's "would-be innocence when she's playing up to Sidharth, and slight cunning when she chooses Radhakrishnan is perfect" adding that she brought her character Madhumitha "to life, an alluring mix of child and woman; irritating, sly, yet arousing your sympathy in the climax".

Tamannaah later appeared in R. Kannan's Kanden Kadhalai, the official remake of Jab We Met (2007), co-starring Bharath. Her voice was dubbed by playback singer Chinmayi. Kanden Kadhalai opened to decent feedback from critics and Tamannaah's performance won praise from them. A reviewer from Sify stated: "Funny and full of life, it is Tamannaah who is the heart and soul of this love story. She has come up with a live wire performance and the magic of the film lies in her performance", adding that no actress in Tamil cinema could play that role better than her though she did not look like a Thevar girl hailing from Theni. Her performance in the film earned her a nomination at the 57th Filmfare Awards South in the Best Tamil Actress category, making her the only actress to earn two nominations in two different languages at that event.  She also won the South Scope award for the same. During this phase, she was established as an undisputed top actress in Tamil cinema.

Tamannaah's first release of 2010 was N. Linguswamy's Paiyaa, co-starring Karthi, which was a Tamil road movie. The film opened to positive reviews from critics and was a commercial success. She earned a nomination each at the 58th Filmfare Awards South and 5th Vijay Awards in the Best Tamil Actress category. Her other two releases of 2010 were S. P. Rajkumar's Sura, co-starring Vijay and M. Raja's Thillalangadi, co-starring Jayam Ravi, the former being Vijay's 50th film as an actor and the latter being the official remake of Surender Reddy's Kick (2009). Both the films flopped at the box office.

2011–2012: Breakthrough in Telugu cinema 
Tamannaah's first release of 2011 was Siva's Siruthai, co-starring Karthi, which was the official remake of S. S. Rajamouli's Vikramarkudu (2006). Her character was received poorly by critics, with Pavithra Srinivasan of Rediff.com citing that she offered "little more than arm-candy". The film, however, was commercially successful. She followed it with a cameo appearance in the song "Aga Naga" from K. V. Anand's Ko.

She made her comeback to Telugu cinema after a two-year gap in the same year with Sukumar's 100% Love, co-starring Naga Chaitanya, in which she played the role of a village girl visiting her cousin's house in Hyderabad for pursuing higher education. She won praise for her performance from the critics. A reviewer from IndiaGlitz stated that Tamannaah "stole the show in the film" and "doesn't over act or underplay her role anywhere". The reviewer added that she "is drop dead gorgeous and steals your heart with her beauty" and "wins on two counts-one is her endearing action and two is her insanely adorable looks". The film became one of the biggest commercial successful Telugu films of 2011. She earned a nomination each at the 59th Filmfare Awards South and 1st South Indian International Movie Awards in the Best Telugu Actress category. She also won the Best Actor Female awards at CineMAA Awards 2012 and The Hyderabad Times Film Awards 2011. Her next release of 2011 was V. V. Vinayak's Badrinath, co-starring Allu Arjun. Her looks in the film became debatable considering her girl-next-door looks sported in her previous films. The film received mixed to negative reviews from critics. Suresh Kavirayani of The Times of India (newspaper) felt that Tamannaah was "energetic, but there was unnecessary skin show even in scenes that didn't seem to require it". However, the film became a notable success at the box office. She earned a nomination at the CineMAA awards 2012 in the best actor female category.

She played the role of a village girl in Hari's Venghai, co-starring Dhanush, whom she called a "subtle and underplayed" character. Both the film and her performance opened to mixed reviews from critics, with Pavithra Srinivasan of Rediff.com stating that Tamannaah "appears neatly attired in classy dresses but suddenly takes to wearing skimpy clothes that display her midriff" and looks "so dazzlingly white that you want to reach for your sun-glasses". Her next release Oosaravelli, co-starring N. T. Rama Rao Jr. and directed by Surender Reddy, opened to mixed reviews from critics, and was a commercial failure.

Tamannaah starred in four Telugu films in 2012, the first one being Sampath Nandi's Racha, co-starring Ram Charan, in which she played the role of a rich girl living in a protected world whose character's layers are revealed as the film progresses. Upon release, Tamannaah received praise from the critics with Sify reviewer calling her the film's "major asset", and Karthik Pasupulate of The Times of India stating that she "does the needful" and "does add more than glamour value to the film". The film was declared a major commercial success by the end of its 50-day run. She earned a nomination each at 60th Filmfare Awards South and CineMAA Awards 2013 in the best actor female category.

Her next release, A. Karunakaran's Endukante... Premanta!, co-starring Ram, opened to negative reviews and was a commercial failure. However, critics praised hers and Ram's performance in the film, with Y. Sunita Chowdary of The Hindu stating that they have "done their best to bring some semblance of reality to this fantasy", and Radhika Rajamani of Rediff.com calling them the film's "heart and soul". Her third release, Raghava Lawrence's Rebel, co-starring Prabhas, in which she played a hip hop dance teacher, opened to mixed reviews and was a commercial failure and escalation of budget was cited as one of the primary reasons. Her last release of 2012 was Puri Jagannadh's Cameraman Gangatho Rambabu, co-starring Pawan Kalyan, in which she played the role of a tomboyish media cameraman. The film was one of the biggest commercial successful Telugu films of 2012.

2013–2014: Re-entry into Hindi and Tamil cinema 
Tamannaah's first release of 2013 was Sajid Khan's Himmatwala, co-starring Ajay Devgn, which was the remake of the 1983 Hindi film of the same name, where she reprises the role of Sridevi from the original. Khan chose her considering her popularity in the South Indian cinema and the film marked her comeback to Hindi cinema. The film opened to negative reviews from critics, who felt that she matched Sridevi in terms of glamour, but failed in terms of acting skills which they termed as "below average". Himmatwala emerged as big flop at the box office.

Her other release of 2013 was Kishore Kumar Pardasany's Tadakha, co-starring Naga Chaitanya, Sunil and Andrea Jeremiah, the official Telugu remake of N. Lingusamy's Vettai, where she reprises the role played by Amala Paul in the original. The film opened to moderate reviews from critics, and was commercially successful. She earned a nomination at the 3rd South Indian International Movie Awards in the Best Actor Female category.

She made her comeback to Tamil cinema in 2014 after a sabbatical of three years with Siva's Veeram, co-starring Ajith Kumar. She said in an interview that she was in talks for a lot of Tamil films and would be signing a few soon. Veeram received positive reviews from critics, and became one of the highest grossing Tamil films of 2014. She again collaborated with Sajid Khan for the film Humshakals as one of the female leads. The film co-starred Saif Ali Khan, Ram Kapoor, Riteish Deshmukh, Bipasha Basu and Esha Gupta. The film received poor reviews from critics, and flopped at the box office. Tamannaah received a nomination at the 7th Golden Kela Awards in the worst actress category.

She performed her first item number in V. V. Vinayak's Alludu Seenu, starring Bellamkonda Sreenivas and Samantha Ruth Prabhu which she accepted to do upon Vinayak's request after walking out of the film initially due to changes in its script. That song, titled "Labbar Bomma", was well received by the audience.

In her next release, Entertainment, directed by Sajid-Farhad, co-starring Akshay Kumar, she played the role of a television actress. While the film was a semi-hit at the box office, Her last release of 2014 was Srinu Vaitla's Aagadu, co-starring Mahesh Babu, in which she played the role of a village belle owning a chain of sweet shops. The film opened to mixed reviews and was a commercial failure at the box office.

2015–2017: Roles in commercial films 

Tamannaah made a cameo appearance as herself in Jagadish's Nannbenda, starring Udhayanidhi Stalin and Nayantara. She also dubbed her own voice for the same. In July 2015, the first part of S. S. Rajamouli's two-part multilingual fictional epic film Baahubali, co-starring Prabhas, Rana Daggubati and Anushka Shetty, was released. She played the role of Avanthika, a Warrior Princess of an unspecified era. For her role, she had to lose  of weight and also, special care was taken regarding the looks, costumes and jewelry of her character. The film received positive reviews from critics and Tamannaah was praised for her performance.

Her next release was M. Rajesh's Vasuvum Saravananum Onna Padichavanga, co-starring Arya, N. Santhanam and Bhanu, in which she would showcase her own jewelry designs from Wite and Gold. The film received negative reviews from the critics. Later, she made a cameo appearance in the bilingual film Size Zero, which stars Arya, Anushka Shetty and Sonal Chauhan.

Her last release of 2015 was Sampath Nandi's Bengal Tiger, co-starring Ravi Teja for the first time. She was praised for her looks in the film. It opened to mixed reviews, but was commercially successful at the box office by grossing  globally and also became the 8th highest grossing Telugu film of the year. Tamannaah expressed her happiness over the success of the film and said "Without Ravi Teja sir I can't imagine this film as only he could justify the character".

She performed her second item number in Bhimaneni Srinivasa Rao's Speedunnodu, starring Bellamkonda Sreenivas and Sonarika Bhadoria, which released in February 2016. Her next release was Vamsi's Oopiri, which is a remake of The Intouchables (2011), co-starring Nagarjuna and Karthi, being filmed in Telugu and Tamil simultaneously. The film opened to positive reviews.

Her next release was the Tamil film Dharma Durai, In which she played a doctor and she also appeared in the film without makeup and it opened to positive reviews. The film also ran successfully in box office. Her next release was a Short Film – Ranveer Ching Returns with Ranveer Singh, directed by Rohit Shetty and it received positive reviews from critics. In October 2016, Tamannah released her third item number in the Telugu-Kannada bilingual film Jaguar. Her next release was the trilingual (TamilTeluguHindi) film Devi. For the first time, she appeared in double role in full length and in her first horror film in three different languages and it also opened to positive reviews. She has also been praised for her acting in the film and the film collected  at box office, in three languages. and her last release in 2016 was Kaththi Sandai, co-starring Vishal. It opened to mixed reviews from critics and became commercial failure.

Her first release in 2017 was Baahubali 2: The Conclusion. In this film, Tamannaah plays a role of Avanthika, a member of a rebel group against from an evil Bhallaladeva and eventual queen of Mahismati. It became the highest grosser Of all time in India in all languages in five days, grossing . Baahubali 2 became the highest grossing Indian film ever with worldwide gross of approx.  in all languages in just seven days, surpassing PK worldwide gross of ₹792 crore. On the 9th day, Baahubali 2 became the first Indian film ever to collect . Her next release in Tamil was Anbanavan Asaradhavan Adangadhavan also known as AAA, her first collaboration with Silambarasan. The film opened to mixed reviews and commercial failure. Her next release was "Swing Zara," the fourth item song in Jai Lava Kusas, along with Jr. NTR, directed by K. S. Ravindra.

2018–present : Back to back Telugu and Tamil films 

Her first release in 2018 was Vikram's Sketch, directed by Vijay Chander on Pongal along with Thaanaa Serndha Koottam and Gulaebaghavali. Sketch opened to mixed reviews from critics and audiences. Tamannaah was praised for her performance as Amuthavali, a south Indian Brahmin girl in the film. Her next release was the Marathi film Aa Bb Kk. It opened to positive reviews and became a commercial success. Her next release was the Telugu film Naa Nuvve, in which she was paired opposite Nandamuri Kalyan Ram for the first time. It opened to mixed reviews and was a commercial failure. Her next release was a Telugu film Next Enti? opposite Sundeep Kishan directed by Bollywood filmmaker Kunal Kohli. The film opened to mixed reviews from critics and commercial failure. However, Tamannaah's performance was highly praised by the critics and audiences in both the movies. Her last release in 2018 was Kannada film KGF: Chapter 1 along with Yash in which she made a special appearance in the item number for the Kannada, Tamil and Telugu releases.

Tamannaah's first release of 2019 was F2: Fun and Frustration a  Telugu language comedy film, along with Venkatesh, Varun Tej and Mehreen Pirzada. It became the biggest blockbuster in Telugu cinema and collected  ₹127.2 crores at the box office. Her next release was Kanne Kalaimaane a Tamil-language drama film written and directed by Seenu Ramasamy, with Udhayanidhi Stalin. In May end, Devi 2 a Tamil horror comedy film co-written and directed by A. L. Vijay was released. It is the sequel to the 2016 film Devi. The film featured Prabhu Deva and Tamannaah reprising their roles from the first film, along with Nandita Swetha, and Dimple Hayati. Her next release was, Khamoshi a Hindi-language slasher film with Prabhu Deva as the lead antagonist, directed by Chakri Toleti and produced by Pyx Films. She played a deaf and mute girl. It was simultaneously made in Tamil as Kolaiyuthir Kaalam, it was a remake of the 2016 American film, Hush. This film received poor reviews from audiences and critics. Her next release was, Sye Raa Narasimha Reddy a Telugu-language biographical epic action film directed by Surender Reddy and produced by Ram Charan. The story of the film is based on the life of freedom fighter Uyyalawada Narasimha Reddy from the Rayalaseema region of Andhra Pradesh and it opened to highly positive reviews from critics as well as audience and her role was highly praised. It collected more than 200 crore in its 10 days run. Her next release was, Petromax a Tamil-language comedy horror film directed by Rohin Venkatesan and produced by Passion Studios, a remake of the Telugu film Anando Brahma. It also opened to positive reviews and doing well in Box-office. Her last release in 2019 was a Tamil film, Action, directed by Sundar C. in which she paired opposite Vishal for second time and it opened to mixed reviews but her role was highly praised by critics. In 2019, she released seven films in three languages.

Her first release in 2020 was a Telugu film Sarileru Neekevvaru along with Mahesh Babu in which she made a special appearance in the party song, "Daang Daang". She has completed two web series: November Story for Disney+ Hotstar and 11th Hour for Aha, in which 11th Hour was released on 8 April 2021 and November Story on 20 May 2021. Her upcoming films include the Hindi film Bole Chudiyan alongside Nawazuddin Siddiqui directed by Shamas Nawab Siddiqui and the long delayed That Is Mahalakshmi, a female-centric Telugu-language comedy-drama film produced by Manu Kumaran, a remake of the 2014 Hindi film Queen by Vikas Bahl. In October 2019, she signed on to appear in the sports drama Seetimaarr opposite Gopichand directed by Sampath Nandi. In September 2020, it was announced that she will star alongside Nithiin and Nabha Natesh in the Telugu remake of the Hindi crime thriller Andhadhun. Tamannaah has reunited with Venkatesh, Varun Tej and Mehreen Pirzada in the sequel to her 2019 film F2: Fun and Frustration titled F3, which released on 27 May 2022.

In November 2021, it was announced that she will star alongside Chiranjeevi and Keerthy Suresh in Bhola Shankar, a Telugu remake of the Tamil action drama Vedalam. In December 2021, Tamannaah was named amongst the top 10 most popular Indian actors on Over-the-top media service (OTT).

In October 2022, Tamannaah was confirmed to be joining Malayalam actor Dileep in Arun Gopy's Bandra marking her debut in Malayalam cinema. She signed a Hindi web-series of Disney+ Hotstar produced by Preeti Simoes her sister Neeti.

Filmography

Awards and nominations

Other work 

Tamannaah also has experience as a model appearing in various television commercials. She is endorsing popular brands like Fanta and Chandrika Ayurvedic soap.

In March 2015, she signed as a brand ambassador for channel Zee Telugu. On 31 March 2015, Tamannaah launched a retail jewelry business named Wite-n-Gold. The website was started on 20 April 2015 marking the festival Akshaya Tritiya. She was also Creative head for her jewelry brand. In January 2016 she also became the brand ambassador of the Government of India's campaign Beti Bachao, Beti Padhao, an initiative of FOGSI. She reportedly charged Rs 50 lakhs for a 10-minute performance during the opening of IPL 2018 where she danced to four songs from four different languages of Telugu, Tamil, Kannada and Hindi.

Her first book entitled Back To The Roots will be published by Penguin Random House India on 30 August 2021. Tamannaah hosted MasterChef India – Telugu which was premiered on Gemini TV on 27 August 2021.

References

External links 
 
 
 
 

1989 births
Actresses in Tamil cinema
Living people
Sindhi people
Indian Hindus
Indian people of Sindhi descent
Actresses in Telugu cinema
Actresses in Hindi cinema
Indian film actresses
21st-century Indian actresses
Actresses from Mumbai
Indian child actresses
Female models from Mumbai
CineMAA Awards winners
Santosham Film Awards winners